Canadian Baptists of Ontario and Quebec (CBOQ) is the oldest union of Baptist churches in central Canada. The organization's headquarters is based in Etobicoke, Toronto, Ontario, Canada. CBOQ is a partner of Canadian Baptist Ministries.

History
In 1880, a Baptist Union of Canada was formed. Since the churches were located chiefly in the central provinces, the name was changed in 1888 to Baptist Convention of Ontario and Quebec (BCOQ).  In 1927 the Fundamentalist–Modernist Controversy resulted in 77 churches splitting off to form the Union of Regular Baptist Churches – out of which the current Fellowship of Evangelical Baptist Churches in Canada merged in 1953. In 1944, the CBOQ joined with the United Baptist Convention of the Maritimes and the Baptist Union of Western Canada to form the Canadian Baptist Federation.  It was renamed in 2008 to "Canadian Baptists of Ontario and Quebec" (CBOQ) to better align with other Baptist groups in Canada:  i.e. Canadian Baptists of Western Canada.

CBOQ meets annually at Assembly, electing officers, addressing issues, and offering workshops. According to its mission statement, "CBOQ exist to equip our churches and leaders to engage in their mission from God in their community." The Canadian Baptist is a monthly e-newsletter and annual magazine that is published by the CBOQ. CBOQ's affiliated seminary is McMaster Divinity College, a part of McMaster University in Hamilton, Ontario. 

CBOQ provides practical and spiritual support to its family of churches and leaders through resources, workshops, prayer and regular gatherings. Through a grant program, CBOQ also supports a variety of ministries geared toward helping the most marginalized in society.

Statistics
According to a denomination census released in 2020, it claimed 330 churches and 28,000 members.

Beliefs  
The denomination has a Baptist confession of faith. CBOQ is a member of Canadian Baptist Ministries, Evangelical Fellowship of Canada and Canadian Council of Churches.

References

Sources
Baptists Around the World, by Albert W. Wardin, Jr.
The Baptist Heritage: Four Centuries of Baptist Witness, by H. Leon McBeth

External links

Baptist denominations in North America
Evangelicalism in Canada
Christianity in Ontario
Christianity in Quebec
Religious organizations established in 1880
1880 establishments in Canada
Organizations based in Toronto
Etobicoke
Baptist Christianity in Canada